Etxarri-Aranatz is a town and municipality located in the province and autonomous community of Navarre, northern Spain. Etxarri-Aranatz was founded in 1312.

During the First Carlist War it was occupied and fortified by Liberal troops. An attempt by Carlists to break in during the autumn of 1834 with the aim of capturing the artillery there failed.

References

External links
 ETXARRI-ARANATZ in the Bernardo Estornés Lasa - Auñamendi Encyclopedia (Euskomedia Fundazioa) 

Municipalities in Navarre